In mathematics, the Schröder number  also called a large Schröder number or big Schröder number, describes the number of lattice paths from the southwest corner  of an  grid to the northeast corner  using only single steps north,  northeast,  or east,  that do not rise above the SW–NE diagonal.

The first few Schröder numbers are

1, 2, 6, 22, 90, 394, 1806, 8558, ... .

where  and  They were named after the German mathematician Ernst Schröder.

Examples
The following figure shows the 6 such paths through a  grid:

Related constructions
The th Schröder number is the number of Schröder paths of length . The following figure shows the 6 Schröder paths of length 2.

Similarly, the Schröder numbers count the number of ways to divide a rectangle into  smaller rectangles using  cuts through  points given inside the rectangle in general position, each cut intersecting one of the points and dividing only a single rectangle in two (i.e., the number of structurally-different guillotine partitions). This is similar to the process of triangulation, in which a shape is divided into nonoverlapping triangles instead of rectangles. The following figure shows the 6 such dissections of a rectangle into 3 rectangles using two cuts:

Pictured below are the 22 dissections of a rectangle into 4 rectangles using three cuts:

The Schröder number  also counts the separable permutations of length

Related sequences
Schröder numbers are sometimes called large or big Schröder numbers because there is another Schröder sequence: the little Schröder numbers, also known as the Schröder-Hipparchus numbers or the super-Catalan numbers. The connections between these paths can be seen in a few ways:

There are two types of paths: those that have movements along the main diagonal and those that do not. The (large) Schröder numbers count both types of paths, and the little Schröder numbers count only the paths that only touch the diagonal but have no movements along it.
 Just as there are (large) Schröder paths, a little Schröder path is a Schröder path that has no horizontal steps on the -axis.

Schröder paths are similar to Dyck paths but allow the horizontal step instead of just diagonal steps.

There is also a triangular array associated with the Schröder numbers that provides a recurrence relation (though not just with the Schröder numbers). The first few terms are

1, 1, 2, 1, 4, 6, 1, 6, 16, 22, .... .

It is easier to see the connection with the Schröder numbers when the sequence is in its triangular form:

Then the Schröder numbers are the diagonal entries, i.e.  where  is the entry in row  and column . The recurrence relation given by this arrangement is
  
Another interesting observation to make is that the sum of the th row is the st little Schröder number; that is,
.

Recurrence relations

 for  
and also
 for

Generating function
.

Uses
One topic of combinatorics is tiling shapes, and one particular instance of this is domino tilings; the question in this instance is, "How many dominoes (that is,  or  rectangles) can we arrange on some shape such that none of the dominoes overlap, the entire shape is covered, and none of the dominoes stick out of the shape?" The shape that the Schröder numbers have a connection with is the Aztec diamond. Shown below for reference is an Aztec diamond of order 4 with a possible domino tiling.

For example:

See also
Delannoy number
Motzkin number
Narayana number
Schröder–Hipparchus number
Catalan number

References

Further reading

 Stanley, Richard P.: Catalan addendum to Enumerative Combinatorics, Volume 2

Integer sequences
Enumerative combinatorics